Chak Ting Fung (born 27 November 1989) is a Hong Kong professional footballer who currently plays for Hong Kong Premier League club Southern. His position is right back and left back.

Club career

Rangers
Chak Ting Fung gave up his studies after completing form 4 and took up professional football when he was only 16.

2009–10 season
On 22 May 2010, after a 0:3 loss to TSW Pegasus FC, Chak Ting Fung was taken by team boss Philip Li to the stands to meet South China AA convener Steven Lo, sparking rumours in the press that he would join the Caroliners. But in the end he stayed with the club.

2010–11 season
For the 2010–11 season, due to the cut on foreigners quota, Chak Ting Fung was named by Philip Li as an important prospect for the club, along with teammate Lam Hok Hei.

But in January 2011, Chak Ting Fung was highly criticised by Rangers boss Philip Lee, for "sleepwalking" on the pitch after the club lost a league game to Pegasus. Philip added that he had no choice but to put him on sale. Later in June, Chak Ting Fung confirmed he would stay with Rangers.

South China
He joined South China in January 2013.

Tai Po
After South China's decision to self-relegate in June 2017, Chak left the club. He later joined his former South China teammates Tsang Man Fai and Leung Kwun Chung at Tai Po.

Eastern
On 17 July 2019, Eastern announced that they had signed Chak.

Southern
On 2 July 2021, Chak joined Southern after being released by Eastern.

International career

Hong Kong
Chak Ting Fung's first game for Hong Kong national football team was at home against Yemen in an 2011 AFC Asian Cup qualification match in March 2010. Chak said he would treasure every second if he got on the pitch.

He was named in the 25 men squad to face Malaysia on 3 June 2011.

Hong Kong U23
Chak Ting Fung was named in the initial 23 men squad for the 2009 East Asian Games. But on the eve of the tournament, he quit after suffering an injury. Chak was disappointed that he missed out on the gold medal.

In the 2010 Asian Games, he suffered a broken nose in the match against Bangladesh and went through surgery in the hospital after the game. His nose was bandaged and although doctor ordered him not to play, he appeared at the second round match against Oman with a face mask and was prepared to play. In the end he was an unused substitute.

Career statistics

International

Honours

Club
Eastern
 Hong Kong Senior Shield: 2019–20
 Hong Kong FA Cup: 2019–20

Tai Po
 Hong Kong Premier League: 2018–19

Personal life
Chak married his girlfriend of two years, Ceci, on 4 November 2019.

References

External links

1987 births
Living people
Hong Kong footballers
Hong Kong international footballers
Hong Kong First Division League players
Hong Kong Premier League players
Hong Kong Rangers FC players
South China AA players
Tai Po FC players
Eastern Sports Club footballers
Southern District FC players
Footballers at the 2010 Asian Games
Association football defenders
Asian Games competitors for Hong Kong
Hong Kong League XI representative players